The Dishonored Medal is a 1914 silent American adventure film, directed by Christy Cabanne. It stars Miriam Cooper, George Gebhard, and Raoul Walsh, and was released on May 3, 1914.

Cast list
 Miriam Cooper as Zora
 George Gebhard as Lieutenant Dubois
 Raoul Walsh as Adopted Son
 Frank Bennett as Bel Kahn, son of Achmed
 Mabel Van Buren as Anitra
 Dark Cloud as Sheik Achmed

References

External links

Films directed by Christy Cabanne
American silent feature films
American black-and-white films
1910s American films
Silent adventure films